Perrigny is the name or part of the name of several communes in France:

Perrigny, Jura, in the Jura département 
Perrigny, Yonne, in the Yonne département 
Perrigny-lès-Dijon, in the Côte-d'Or département 
Perrigny-sur-Armançon, in the Yonne département 
Perrigny-sur-l'Ognon, in the Côte-d'Or département 
Perrigny-sur-Loire, in the Saône-et-Loire département

See also
, a French collier in service 1947-62
Périgny (disambiguation)